The Estonian Small Cup is a knock-out competition for Estonian amateur teams, which play in the 4th or lower level. The first competition was won by Kohtla-Järve JK Alko in 2005 and the latest title was given to Saue JK. Finals are held in Tallinn, A. Le Coq Arena since 2007.

Finals

Winners

Finalists

References

 
3
2005 establishments in Estonia